The yellow-billed barbet (Trachyphonus purpuratus) is a species of bird in the Lybiidae family.

It is found in Angola, Benin, Burundi, Cameroon, Central African Republic, Republic of the Congo, Democratic Republic of the Congo, Ivory Coast, Equatorial Guinea, Gabon, Ghana, Guinea, Kenya, Liberia, Nigeria, Rwanda, Sierra Leone, South Sudan, Togo, and Uganda.

References

yellow-billed barbet
Birds of Sub-Saharan Africa
yellow-billed barbet
Taxonomy articles created by Polbot
Taxobox binomials not recognized by IUCN